The Shingo River is a tributary of the Indus River, and flows through Gilgit-Baltistan and Kargil regions. The river originates in Gilgit-Batistan and flows into the Kargil district where it joins the  Dras River. The combined river receives the waters of the Suru River and flows into Baltistan again, joining the Indus River river near Marol.

Course 
The river originates in the Chhota Deosai plains in the Astore District north of Minimarg, then flows east. The Shigar or Shiggar River, which originates in the Bara Deosai Plateau to the north, also flows east and joins the Shingo River before it enters the Indian-administered Kargil district near Dalunang. In the Kargil district, at the Kaksar village, Shingo is joined by the Dras River, which originates near Zojila Pass and flows northeast. The flow of Shingo is then doubled. The combined river, which is either called Dras or Shingo, flows east till the hamlet of Kharul, 7 km north of Kargil, where it makes a 90-degree bend to flow north-northeast.

Also at Kharul, the Suru River joins the Dras/Shingo river and the latter in effect flows through the channel of the Suru River as it turns north. The combined river flows through the Kharmang District of Baltistan, passing by the substantial village of Olding on the left, before joining the Indus River a little above Marol..

The Shingo river is clearer than other rivers in Ladakh because it is formed from melting ice. It flows through Chanigund.

Environment 
The Shingo River runs north of the Line of Control dividing the Indian- and Pakistani-administered portions of Kashmir. Gultari is the largest city on its course. A road runs parallel to the river, which once connected Kargil to Astore District. Once in the Kargil, the valley of the Shingo–Drass river contains India's National Highway 1 connecting the Kashmir and Ladakh. After reentering Baltistan, its valley supports the Shingo River Road, which is also called the Kargil–Skardu Road.

Notes

References

External links
 Shingo River marked on OpenStreet 
 Dras/Shingo/Suru River basin on OpenStreetMap

Rivers of Ladakh
Indus basin
Rivers of Gilgit-Baltistan
Astore District
Skardu District
Kargil district
Rivers of Pakistan
Rivers of India